Ron Kavana (born 25 December 1950) is an Irish singer, songwriter, guitarist and band leader.  Born in the County Cork town of Fermoy, he is the son of an Irish father and an American mother from Chicago with Cajun roots.

Performing with a lengthy list of bands, Kavana has performed with influential musicians from the worlds of Celtic music, British soul, blues, rhythm & blues, rock, Irish folk and folk-rock, and worldbeat music. His Galway to Graceland album was described as an album of blues, Tex Mex, country, rock, cajun, and occasionally Irish influenced music. A talented songwriter, Kavana has written songs exploring history and politics, as well as drinking, dancing, and playing music.  The Village Voice has called him a "hard-hitting, no-nonsense realist".

Biography

Early career
After cutting his early musical teeth in a R&B band, the Wizards, Kavana moved to London in the late 1970s.  He got a job at Rock on Records, replacing Philip Chevron, who was leaving to work full-time with his band, The Radiators From Space. In 1977, Kavana put together Kavana's Krisis Band, playing regularly at Islington's Hope & Anchor.  This band evolved into Juice on the Loose, who became something of a house band for Ace Records, with Kavana as band leader and producer.  During this era, Kavana and members of the band toured and recorded with many American acts, including Big Jay McNeely, Clarence "Frogman" Henry, Willie Egan, Dr. John, Doug Sahm, Augie Meyers and Flaco Jiminez, Wallace Davenport, Gatemouth Brown, Memphis Slim, Champion Jack Dupree, and Slim Gaillard. Kavana appears on Juice on the Loose's self-titled album, released on Line Records in 1981. Other Juice on the Loose recordings would surface on Kavana's first solo album, Rollin' & Coastin'.

Throughout the 1970s and 1980s, Kavana also played with Panama Red, The Thunderbirds, The Balham Alligators, and The Alexis Korner Band.  Following a European R & B package tour backing Korner, Kavana played an anniversary show for the Boogie Woogie Band's anniversary at Dingwalls, with an all-star band that included Charlie Watts on drums and Jack Bruce on bass.

Solo career
Kavana released his first solo album, Rollin' & Coastin' in 1985, on the Italian record label, Appaloosa.  The album was a compilation of solo tracks and Juice on The Loose recordings.

In the mid/late 1980s, Kavana opened several tours for The Pogues, including a December/January 1985/1986 jaunt through Ireland, where he performed as a duo with Elvis Costello.  Pogues management considered Kavana as a replacement for departing bass player/singer Cait O'Riordan. The band chose road crew member Darryl Hunt for the job, but Kavana made several appearances on The Pogues' album If I Should Fall From Grace With God, and co-wrote two songs with Pogue Terry Woods: "Every Man Is A King (In The U.S. of A.)" and "Young Ned of the Hill", the former released originally as a B-side and the latter included on The Pogues album, Peace and Love.

In 1990, Kavana produced the album For The Children.  Featuring 29 guests (including several members of The Pogues), the album was a fundraiser for LILT (London Irish Live Trust), a charity organisation working for peace in Northern Ireland.

By the late 1980s, Kavana had formed the eclectic group Alias Ron Kavana. The group was subsequently named "Best Live Act in the World" by Folk Roots magazine in 1989, 1990, and 1991. The Alias Band's first album, Think Like a Hero, was released in 1989. Alias Ron Kavana's second album, Coming Days, followed in 1991.

Terry Woods joined forces with Ron Kavana and recorded the album Home Fire, released as Kavana's second solo effort in 1991. The two appear together in the 1990 Ken Loach film, Hidden Agenda, performing the Wolfe Tones' song "The Ballad Of Joe McDonnell".

After quitting The Pogues, Woods joined with Kavana and formed a new band, The Bucks.  This line-up recorded the album Dancing to the ceili band, released in 1994 on WEA. The album and the band's live shows were well received by fans and critics, but the group disbanded after a short time.  Kavana cites lack of label support as a reason, and claims he "never got a penny" for the album.

Returning to the Alias Band, Kavana recorded Galway to Graceland (ARK 002) in 1995.  The album was self-financed and produced independently.  Due to financial difficulties it was deleted before getting a full release.

Kavana again entered Pogues territory, this time playing guitar in an early version of Shane MacGowan's band The Popes.  Kavana's guitar work can be heard on "Haunted", a duet featuring Sinéad O'Connor.  He also came up with the tune for "Snake With Eyes of Garnet" from MacGowan's first solo album, The Snake, although he received no credit for this work.

Academics and current career
In 1995, frustrated by problems with record labels and the music business generally, and finding himself financially under pressure, Kavana took a three-year break from the industry, enrolling in a full-time Humanities course, graduating with first-class honours in Irish studies and film studies.

Working on and off for several years, Kavana released a two-disc set Irish Songs of Rebellion, Resistance and Reconciliation in 2006.  This was followed by the 2007 four disc set Irish Ways: Story of Ireland in Song, Music & Poetry.  The albums followed Irish history through songs and poems from 1796 to the present day.  The albums are credited to The Alias Acoustic Band.

Discography

Albums
  Juice on the Loose (1981) (Juice On The Loose), Chiswick Records
  Rollin' & Coastin (1985), (Ron Kavana) Appaloosa Records
  Think Like a Hero (1989) (Alias Ron Kavana), Chiswick Records
  For the Children (1990) (LILT – The London Irish Live Trust), Alias Records
  Coming Days (1991) (Alias Ron Kavana), Chiswick Records
  Home Fire (1991) (Ron Kavana), Special Delivery/Topic Records, Green Linnet Records (1992)
  Dancin' To The Ceili Band (1994) (The Bucks), WEA
  Galway to Graceland (1995) (Alias Ron Kavana), Alias Recordings
  Alien Alert (live) (1999) (Ron Kavana with The Resident Aliens), Proper Records
  Irish Songs of Rebellion, Resistance and Reconciliation (2006) (Ron Kavana and the Alias Acoustic Band), Primo Records
  Irish Ways: Story of Ireland in Song, Music & Poetry (2007) (Ron Kavana) Proper Records
  40 Favourite Folk Songs (2011) (Ron Kavana and Friends), Primo Records

Other releases
  "Any Way The Wind Blows" and "Fermoy" on Any Way The Wind Blows 7" Single (Juice On The Loose) (1980) The Songwriter's Workshop
  "Sweet Love In The Valley", b-side on Cowboys And Indians 7" Single (Juice On The Loose) (1981) The Songwriter's Workshop
  "A Living Wage"  on  Hard Cash  (Various Artists)  (1990)  Green Linnet Records
  "Who Knows Where the Time Goes?"  on  Get Weaving  (Various Artists)  (1992)  Weaving Records
  "Stand/Close It Down"  (as Ron & Miriam Kavana)  Undefeated - A Benefit For The Miners  (Various Artists)  (1992)  Fuse Records
  "Lovely Cottage-Gold Ochra At Killarny Point To Points"  on  Folk Heritage  (Various Artists)  (1992)  Music Club International
  "Lovely Cottage-Gold Ochra At Killarny Point To Points"  on  Folk Heritage II  (Various Artists)  (1992)  Music Club International
  "As I Roved Out" on Giving People Choices (Various Artists) (1993) ActionAid 
  "Reconciliation"  on  The Folk Collection  (Various Artists)  (1993)  Topic Records
  "I Want to See the Bright Lights Tonight"  on  The World Is a Wonderful Place: The Songs of Richard Thompson  (Various Artists)  (1993)  Green Linnet Records
  "Sloop John B."  on  Out on the Rolling Sea - A Tribute to Joseph Spence (Various Artists)   (1994)  Hokey Pokey Records
  "The Kilshannig Wager"  on  The Folk Collection 2   (Various Artists)  (1995)  Topic Records
  "Home Fire/Beyond The Pale"  on  Delicias Celtas  (Various Artists)  (1995)  Ediciones Resistencia  
  "St. Patrick's Day In New Orleans"  (as Alias Ron Kavana) on fRoots #6  (Various Artists)  (1996)  Folk Roots
  "Reconciliation", "Fermoy Regatta/Tom's Tavern" on A Living Thing: Contemporary Classics of Traditional Irish Music (Various Artists, Produced by Ron Kavana) Globe Style
  "Pennies For Black Babies"  (as Alias Ron Kavana) on Roots - 20 Years Of Essential Folk, Roots & World Music  (Various Artists)  (1999)  Manteca
  "Reconciliation"  on  Topic Records: Three Score & Ten: A Voice to the People  (Various Artists)   (1999)  Topic Records

In film
Kavana has appeared in and/or composed music for the soundtracks of such films as Sid and Nancy, Ryan's Daughter, and Hidden Agenda (1990).

References

External links
 

1950 births
Living people
Irish male singer-songwriters
Irish mandolinists
Irish male guitarists
Irish harmonica players
Irish blues guitarists
Musicians from County Cork
Musicians from London
People from Fermoy
Proper Records artists
Green Linnet Records artists